Pic Petit de Segre or  Puigmal Petit del Segre is a mountain of Catalonia, France and Spain. Located in the Pyrenees, it has an elevation of 2,810 metres above sea level.

See also
Pic del Segre
Mountains of Catalonia

References

Vall de Núria Map, ed. Alpina

External links
 Hiking from Fontalba

Mountains of Catalonia
Mountains of the Pyrenees